Arthur Stuart-Menteth Hutchinson (2 June 1879 – 14 March 1971), commonly known by his initials A. S. M. Hutchinson, was a British novelist.

Biography
Hutchinson was born on 2 June 1879 in India. His father was a distinguished soldier and his mother was a member of the Stuart Menteths, a noble Scottish family. His sister, Vere Stuart-Menteth Hutchinson, was also a novelist.

A. S. M Hutchinson was editor of the London illustrated newspaper, The Daily Graphic. He wrote romance and family novels as well as short stories for publications such The Sphere Magazine. His best-selling novel, If Winter Comes, was in many aspects ahead of its time, dealing with an unhappy marriage, eventual divorce, and an unwed mother who commits suicide. According to The New York Times, If Winter Comes was the best-selling book in the United States for all of 1922. If Winter Comes was so popular that clergymen gave sermons on the plight of the novel's hero, Mark Sabre. The following year, Fox Film Corporation made it into a motion picture of the same name directed by Harry F. Millarde.

In 1922, his book This Freedom was published to controversy, seen by the women's rights movement as an anti-feminist novel. Rebecca West criticised This Freedom in an October 1922 article for Good Housekeeping, "Wives, Mothers, and Homes". G. K. Chesterton, however, suggested that "while the story might be criticized, the criticisms can certainly be criticized." In any case, This Freedom proved to be highly successful and was ranked by the New York Times as the 7th best-selling book in the United States for 1923 and the 6th best for all of 1924. The publishing historian George Stevens later described This Freedom as "probably the worst novel Little, Brown ever published". The next year, Hutchinson had another success with One Increasing Purpose that was the 10th best-selling book of 1925. In 1930, he was so thrilled by the birth of his son he wrote a book about it called The Book of Simon.

He died in 1971 in Uckfield, Sussex, England.

Bibliography

(1908). Once Aboard the Lugger.
(1912). The Happy Warrior. 
(1914). The Clean Heart. 
(1921). If Winter Comes.
(1922). This Freedom. 
(1923). The Eighth Wonder and Other Stories. 
(1925). One Increasing Purpose. 
(1929). The Uncertain Trumpet. 
(1930). The Book of Simon. 
(1932). Big Business. 
(1933). The Soft Spot.
(1935). A Year That the Locust.
(1938). As Once You Were  
(1940). He Looked for a City. 
(1942). It Happened Like This. 
(1960). Of Swinburne.

Short stories
 "The Swordsman," Blackwood's Magazine, Vol. CCXI, January/June, 1922.
 "Some Talk of Alexander." In: The Best British Short Stories of 1923. Boston: Small, Maynard & Company, Inc., 1923.

References

Twentieth Century Authors: A Biographical Dictionary of Modern Literature, edited by Stanley J. Kunitz and Howard Haycraft, New York: The H.W. Wilson Company, 1942.

Further reading
 Adcock, Arthur St. John (1923). "Arthur Stuart-Menteth Hutchinson." In: Gods of Modern Grub Street. New York: Frederick A. Stokes Company, pp. 133–139.
 Hind, C. Lewis (1922). "A. S. M. Hutchinson." In: More Authors and I. New York: Dodd, Mead and Company, pp. 147–151.
 Mais, S.P.B. (1923). "A. S. M. Hutchinson." In: Some Modern Authors. London: Grant Richards Ltd., pp. 75–87.
 Swinnerton, Frank (1967). "Best-Sellers." In: Figures in the Foreground, Literary Reminiscences, 1917-1940. Garden City, N.Y.: Doubleday & Company Inc., pp. 232–252.
  (interview with Hutchinson)

External links 

 
 
 
 Works by A. S. M. Hutchinson, at Hathi Trust
 

20th-century English novelists
English short story writers
1879 births
1971 deaths
English male short story writers
English male novelists
20th-century British short story writers
20th-century English male writers